Rupert Reid is an Australian actor. He is best known for his roles as Declan on the Australian TV show Heartbreak High and later, Constable Jack Lawson on the Australian TV show Blue Heelers from 1999 to 2001. He is the older brother of the actor Sam Reid.

Filmography 
The Heights as Pav (2020)
Reckoning (série) as Emilio (2019)
Brock (2016) 
Winners & Losers (2015) as Rob Hill 
Another Earth (2011) as Keith Harding
Small Claims: White Wedding (2005) as David
The Mystery of Natalie Wood (2004) as Henry Jaglom
Soar (2004) as Simon
The Matrix Revolutions (2003) as Lock's Lieutenant
Enter the Matrix (2003) (VG) as Lock's Lieutenant
The Matrix Reloaded (2003) as Lock's Lieutenant
White Collar Blue as Shane Duggan
The Extreme Team (2003) as Dillon
Blue Heelers (1999–2001) as Const. Jack Lawson 
Kick (1999) as Sinkers
The Sugar Factory (1998) as Bruce Kyle
Meteorites! (1998) as Nurse Ben
Water Rats as Jens
Heartbreak High (1995–96) TV Series as Declan Costello

References

External links

Australian male film actors
Australian male television actors
Living people
Year of birth missing (living people)